Vincenzo Montella  (born 18 June 1974) is an Italian retired footballer and current manager, who played as a striker. He is current manager of Süper Lig club Adana Demirspor.

Montella's nickname during his playing career was "Aeroplanino", in reference to his small stature and trademark goal celebration, in which he spread his arms like wings. A prolific goalscorer, throughout his playing career Montella played as a forward for Italian clubs Empoli, Genoa, Sampdoria and Roma, and also had a spell on loan in England with Fulham. He is mostly remembered for his performances with Roma (1999–2007), where he won the Serie A title and the Supercoppa Italiana during the 2000–01 season, also later reaching the 2003 Coppa Italia final with the club. In 2013, Montella was inducted into the A.S. Roma Hall of Fame. At international level, he made 20 appearances for Italy between 1999 and 2005, scoring three goals; he was notably a member of the Italian team that reached the final of UEFA Euro 2000, and he also represented his country at the 2002 FIFA World Cup.

Montella began his managerial career as Roma's caretaker manager in 2011, later coaching Catania the following season. In 2012, he moved to Fiorentina, where he spent three seasons, leading the club to three consecutive fourth-place league finishes, the 2014 Coppa Italia final and the UEFA Europa League semi-finals in 2015. After a season-long spell with Sampdoria, he was appointed Milan's manager in 2016, and later that year, he won his first title as a coach with the club, the Supercoppa Italiana. He was sacked by the club in 2017 and was subsequently appointed the new manager of Spanish side Sevilla. Despite reaching the Copa del Rey final and reaching the Champions League quarter-finals for the first time in the club's history, he was sacked by Sevilla 4 months after his appointment following a run that included nine matches without a victory. He returned to Fiorentina in 2019, with the second spell lasting over 8 months.

Club career

Early career
Montella began his club career in Serie C1 at Empoli in 1990 before moving to Serie B club Genoa in 1995, where he scored 21 goals in his only season with the club, at the end of which he lifted the Anglo-Italian Cup. He then moved up to Serie A to city rivals Sampdoria, where he remained three years, until 1999. After Sampdoria's relegation, when he moved to Roma in a 50 billion lire (about €25.823 million) transfer.

Montella made his Serie A debut on 8 September 1996, against Perugia.

Roma
It was Roma coach Zdeněk Zeman that wanted him to spearhead the Roma attack, but that year Roma also signed a new coach, Fabio Capello, who disliked short forwards. Despite this, during the 1999–2000 season, Montella scored 18 goals, being the topscorer of the giallorossi, playing alongside Marco Delvecchio, in front of advanced playmaker Francesco Totti. The following year, Roma signed the Argentinian forward Gabriel Batistuta from Fiorentina, the tall striker wanted by Capello.

There was a slight controversy between the two forwards concerning the number 9 shirt, the prior number of both players – Batistuta ultimately chose number 18, although Batistuta was often the coach's first choice, with Montella was usually deployed as a substitute. Despite his lack of starts, he was one of the main protagonists of Roma's third Scudetto in 2000–01 and scored many important goals for the club, including the equalising goal in a 2–2 away draw in Serie A against eventual runners-up Juventus on 6 May 2001, and Roma's second goal in the 3–1 title-deciding victory over Parma on 17 June, at the Stadio Olimpico in Rome.

The controversies between Capello and Montella continued in the following years as Montella was unhappy at his lack of first team opportunities, and in March 2002 Montella made his sadness clear, stating, "I would have better expectations with another coach." Despite his struggle to gain a starting spot, he became a club idol to the supporters, as he had a knack for performing well in the Rome derby against Lazio, scoring a brace in his first derby in 1999 and four goals in a 5–1 win on 10 March 2002; this four-goal haul is still the record of goals scored in a derby match by a single player.

2003 was a difficult year for Montella, as he divorced from his former wife, Rita, and was plagued with many injuries. During the 2003–04 season, he played only 12 games but still managed a solid scoring record, scoring six goals despite his limited playing time.

During the 2004–05 season, Capello finally left Roma – for Juventus – and, while the giallorossi had a disastrous season, Montella scored 23 goals and earned a new contract lasting until 30 June 2010, also helping Roma to the Coppa Italia final that season. In the 2005–06 season, he was again plagued with injuries. He underwent surgery on both his back and shoulder, limiting him to just 12 games. In January 2007, during the 2006–07 season he was loaned to Fulham because Francesco Totti was the lone forward in new head coach Luciano Spalletti's 4–2–3–1 formation, while Montella wanted to have more chances to play.

With Roma, Montella played a total of 215 matches over 8 years, scoring 94 goals to become the fifth-best topscorer in Roma history. He played his last game for Roma on 23 December 2006 before leaving on loan to England.

Loan to Fulham
Montella joined Fulham on a six-month loan on 4 January 2007 and was given the number 11 shirt. He scored twice against Leicester City on his home debut, in the FA Cup. He scored again on 27 January in the same competition against Stoke City.

On 13 January 2007, Montella made his Premier League debut, against West Ham United. Against Tottenham Hotspur at Craven Cottage seven days later, he scored his first Premier League goal with a penalty kick. He also scored a goal against Blackburn Rovers in a 1–1  draw which gave Fulham the boost to avoid relegation.

Montella quickly became popular with the Fulham fans and showed his gratitude for making him feel at home at Craven Cottage. However, he hardly started under manager Chris Coleman, despite several public pleas. After manager Chris Coleman's sacking, Montella only started twice under replacement manager Lawrie Sanchez. Montella hinted that he would like to return to Roma after the end of the 2006–07 season. The loan was terminated by Sanchez on 8 May 2007, a week before its natural expiration.

Loan to Sampdoria and return
He was loaned to Sampdoria for the 2007–08 season. Bruno Conti brought Montella back to Roma in 2008–09, after Mancini had departed Roma to join Internazionale. Montella took number 23 when he came back; Mirko Vučinić held on the number 9 shirt which was formerly Montella's, and Montella took the number 23 shirt, formerly of Vučinić.

Montella was only able to make substitute appearances for Roma in the 2008–09 season. He played his last game on 16 May 2009.

On 2 July 2009, Montella announced his retirement from professional football as a player.

International career
Montella received his first international cap for Italy under Dino Zoff in a UEFA Euro 2000 qualifying match against Wales on 5 June 1999, which Italy won 4–0, coming on as a second-half substitute for Christian Vieri; he was part of the final 22-man Italian squad that took part at Euro 2000, where they reached the final. Although Montella did not score during the competition, he recorded an assist in Italy's final group match against Sweden, setting up Alessandro Del Piero's match-winning goal in the 2–1 victory, which allowed Italy to top their group. He would also make one more appearance during the tournament, in the 2–1 final defeat against France, coming on as a late second-half substitute for Roma teammate and goalscorer Marco Delvecchio, with Italy leading 1–0; France equalised in injury time and eventually won the match in extra-time courtesy of a David Trezeguet golden goal. He scored his first goal for Italy in an international friendly match against South Africa in Perugia on 25 April 2001, a 1–0 home win for Italy. On 27 March 2002, he scored a notable double against England in an international friendly match in Leeds, giving Italy a 2–1 away victory after they had been trailing 1–0, with his second, match-winning goal coming form an injury-time penalty.

After appearing for Italy under Giovanni Trapattoni during their 2002 FIFA World Cup qualifying campaign, Montella was chosen as a member of the Italy team that would be competing at the 2002 World Cup, where the Italians were eliminated controversially in the round of 16 to co-hosts South Korea following a 2–1 defeat in extra time. In his only World Cup appearance, during Italy's final group stage match against Mexico in the 2002 World Cup, he had a goal wrongly disallowed. He later set up Del Piero's equaliser in the eventual 1–1 draw, which helped Italy to progress to the second round. He had warmed up and was ready to come off the bench in the round of 16 match, but South Korea's Ahn scored the golden goal moments before he was set to come on. He later also appeared for Italy in three Euro 2004 qualifying matches, but was not called up for the final tournament. He made his final appearance for Italy under Marcello Lippi, in an international friendly match against Russia on 9 February 2005, held in Cagliari, which Italy won 2–0. In total, Montella won 20 caps and scored 3 goals for Italy.

Style of play
Nicknamed "L'Aeroplanino" ("The Little Airplane"), due to his small stature and trademark goal celebration, in which he spread his arms like wings, Montella was known as a quick, hard-working, intelligent, and opportunistic left-footed striker, who was gifted with pace, good technique and a keen eye for goal, and was capable of striking the ball well with either foot; he has also been described as a "fine all round player, with excellent passing and dribbling skills." Although he was primarily played as a centre-forward, a position in which he earned a reputation as a prolific "goal-poacher", his wide range of skills made him a versatile forward, who also capable of playing in a more creative role as a second striker. However, despite his ability and goalscoring record as a footballer, at times he was criticised by his Roma manager Fabio Capello for being a "selfish" player; he was also known to be injury-prone.

Coaching career

Roma
Montella signed a three-year contract with Roma as youth team coach for the Giovanissimi Nazionali (under-15 level).

On 21 February 2011, he was appointed as interim head coach of the first team for the remainder of the season, taking over the role from resigning boss Claudio Ranieri. On 23 February, in his first Serie A match in charge, Roma won away against Bologna, 1–0. On 8 March, in his Champions League managerial debut, Roma lost away to Shakhtar Donetsk, 3–0. Montella completed an eventful season for Roma, leading the Giallorossi to sixth place in the league table, and he was subsequently released after the new club owners led by American businessman Thomas R. DiBenedetto decided to appoint Luis Enrique as permanent head coach for the 2011–12 season.

Catania
On 9 June 2011, and only a few days after being released by Roma, Montella was announced as new boss of Catania, signing a two-year contract with the Eastern Sicilian club. He led Catania to a mid-table placement, and ahead of Sicilian rivals Palermo for the first time in eight years; by the end of season, he was heavily linked with a comeback at Roma and the vacant job at Fiorentina. Montella left Catania by mutual consent on 4 June 2012, after only one season in charge of the team.

Fiorentina

On 11 June 2012, Fiorentina announced on their official website that Montella signed a two-year-deal (later extended until June 2017) with the Tuscan outfit. Montella's arrival saw a massive upheaval of the squad which saw 17 (including Borja Valero and Alberto Aquilani) out of the 26 senior players being new to the club. Fiorentina finished the 2012–13 Serie A in fourth place, missing out on a Champions League spot to Milan on the final day of the season.

In his second season in charge, Montella led Fiorentina to the 2014 Coppa Italia final, but were beaten 3–1 by Napoli, while the team finished the league season in fourth place once again. In his third season, Montella helped Fiorentina reach the semi-final of the 2014–15 UEFA Europa League, where they were eliminated by defending champions and eventual winners Sevilla. Fiorentina finished the league season in fourth place for the third consecutive season. On 8 June, he was sacked as Fiorentina head coach.

Sampdoria
On 15 November 2015, Sampdoria announced Montella was appointed new head coach. On 28 June 2016, Montella left the club to join Milan.

Milan
On 28 June 2016, Milan announced Montella as their new head coach with a contract starting from 1 July. He signed a two-year deal, reportedly worth €2.3 million per year, while Sampdoria was paid €500,000 as a compensation to release him from his contract. On 23 December, Montella led the "Rossoneri" to their first title since 2011, the Supercoppa Italiana, defeating Juventus 4–3 in a penalty shootout after a 1–1 draw following extra time. With a 6th-place finish in the league his first season as the club's head coach, Montella led Milan to qualify for the 3rd round of 2017–18 UEFA Europa League qualification phase, marking Milan's return to European competition for the first time since February 2014. On 30 May 2017, he signed a new contract until 2019.

Although much was expected of Milan after a €200m summer transfer campaign financed by the team's new owners, the first half of the 2017–18 season was disappointing for the club; Montella drew criticism in the media for struggling to find a suitable formation for his players and a fixed starting eleven, and only won 6 out of first 14 games in the league. Following these poor results at the beginning of the 2017–18 Serie A season, Montella was eventually sacked by Milan on 27 November 2017, following a 0–0 home draw against Torino the day before; Gennaro Gattuso was put in charge as Montella's replacement.

Sevilla
On 28 December 2017, Spanish club Sevilla FC announced the appointment of Montella as a replacement of sacked head coach Eduardo Berizzo, for a contract which would last until mid-2019.

During his tenure, Montella managed to guide Sevilla to a first-ever Champions League quarter-final, defeating Manchester United 2–1 on aggregate in the round of 16. Sevilla were beaten by Bayern Munich in the quarter-finals 2–1 on aggregate. Montella also led Sevilla to the 2018 Copa del Rey final, defeating teams such as Atlético Madrid and Léganes in the process, where they suffered a 5–0 defeat to Barcelona.

Despite being the finalists of the Copa Del Rey, Sevilla struggled with their league form, and on 28 April 2018, Montella was sacked by the club following a run of nine games without a victory.

Return to Fiorentina
On 10 April 2019, Montella returned to Fiorentina after the resignation of Stefano Pioli. Following a 1–4 away defeat to Roma in Serie A on 20 December 2019, he was dismissed from his managerial post the day after.

Media
Montella has featured in EA Sports' FIFA video game series; he was on the cover for the Italian edition of FIFA 2000.

Career statistics

Player

Club

International

International goals
Scores and results list Italy's goal tally first.

Managerial statistics

Honours

Player

Club
 Genoa
 Anglo-Italian Cup: 1995–96

 Roma
 Serie A: 2000–01
 Supercoppa Italiana: 2001

International

 Italy
UEFA European Championship runner-up: 2000

Manager
 Milan
Supercoppa Italiana: 2016

Individual
 Enzo Bearzot Award: 2013
 A.S. Roma Hall of Fame: 2013

Orders
  5th Class / Knight: Cavaliere Ordine al Merito della Repubblica Italiana: 2000

Notes

References

External links

 
 
 
 
 Profile at EnciclopediaDelCalcio.it 
 Profile at FIGC.it 
 Profile at Italia1910.com 

1974 births
Living people
Sportspeople from the Province of Naples
Italian footballers
Italy international footballers
Empoli F.C. players
Genoa C.F.C. players
U.C. Sampdoria players
A.S. Roma players
Fulham F.C. players
Serie A players
Serie B players
Serie C players
Premier League players
UEFA Euro 2000 players
2002 FIFA World Cup players
Italian expatriate footballers
Expatriate footballers in England
Italian expatriate sportspeople in England
A.S. Roma managers
Catania S.S.D. managers
ACF Fiorentina managers
Italian football managers
Serie A managers
U.C. Sampdoria managers
A.C. Milan managers
Association football forwards
Sevilla FC managers
La Liga managers
Italian expatriate football managers
Expatriate football managers in Spain
Italian expatriate sportspeople in Spain
Footballers from Campania
Knights of the Order of Merit of the Italian Republic